Cornel Reluș Irina (born 7 December 1976) is a Romanian former professional footballer who played as a defender. In his career Irina played in over 200 matches for Jiul Petroșani and was also the captain of "the Miners".

Nicknamed "the Bomber" by Jiul's supporters Irina moved in 2005 at Unirea Alba Iulia, but after half of the season moved back in Hunedoara County, this time signing a contract with Corvinul 2005 Hunedoara. In the winter of 2008, Irina signed with Minerul Lupeni, where he was an important player at the level of Liga II, but after a match lost against ACU Arad, Irina had a conflict with the management of the club and left Minerul for Liga III side Retezatul Hațeg.

After a season spent with Retezatul, Irina moved to Minerul Uricani, where he played in over 200 matches, at the level of Liga IV.

Honours
Jiul Petroșani
Divizia B: 2004–05
Divizia C: 2002–03

References

External links
 

1976 births
Living people
People from Petroșani
Romanian footballers
Association football defenders
Liga I players
CSM Jiul Petroșani players
Liga II players
CS Corvinul Hunedoara players
CSM Unirea Alba Iulia players
CS Minerul Lupeni players